Andrés Edgardo Pérez Cruz (born 10 May 1988) is a Puerto Rican international footballer who plays as a defensive midfielder.

Career
Born in Orlando, Florida, Pérez played club soccer for the Barry Buccaneers and at senior level for Sevilla FC Puerto Rico,  Puerto Rico Islanders, Bayamón, Weston FC.

He made his international debut for Puerto Rico in 2011, and has appeared in FIFA World Cup qualifying matches.

References

1988 births
Living people
Puerto Rican footballers
Puerto Rico international footballers
Puerto Rico Islanders players
Association football midfielders
Sevilla FC Puerto Rico players
Bayamón FC players
Weston FC players
North American Soccer League players
Soccer players from Orlando, Florida
Barry Buccaneers men's soccer players
USL League Two players